Ismail Patel (born 1962) is a British optician, and founder of Friends of Al-Aqsa, in Leicester, about 1995.

He is an advisory board member of the Conflicts Forum, director of IslamExpo, and a member of the Special Advisory Board of Clear Conscience.

He writes commentary for The Guardian, and The Independent, Aljazeera English, and Arabian Business.

Gaza Flotilla

He joined the Gaza flotilla, and was on board the MV Mavi Marmara .

He was held by Israel for just under 48 hours and then deported to Turkey.
He flew back to London Heathrow, and gave a press conference with Alex Harrison and Daniel Machover.

References

External links
"Freedom Flotilla Update by Ismail Patel" 24-05-10 Day 1
Friends of Al Aqsa Twitter

1963 births
British Muslims
Living people
British opticians
People from Leicester